Al-Baʻth is an Arabic language newspaper published by the Baʻth Party in Syria and other Arab countries and territories, including Lebanon and Palestine.

History
Al-Baʻth was founded in 1948 and is an organ of the Arab Socialist Ba'ath Party of Syria. In addition to the daily, there are also three more state-owned papers in Syria, Al Thawra, Tishreen and Syria Times. Al Ba'ath is based in Damascus.

From 2002 to 2004 Mahdi Dakhlallah was the editor-in-chief of Al Ba'ath.

See also
 List of newspapers in Syria

References

External links
 Al-Ba'ath 

1948 establishments in Syria
Arabic-language newspapers
Mass media in Damascus
Daily newspapers published in Syria
Organization of the Ba'ath Party
Publications established in 1948